This is a list of active settlement houses.  It includes settlement houses in England, Australia, Canada, and the United States so far.

See also
List of historical settlement houses

References

Settlement houses